The National Engineering School of Monastir or ENIM, is a Tunisian engineering school based in the city of Monastir located in the east of the country. It is part of the University of Monastir.

Establishment

The National Engineering School of Monastir was founded in 1987.

Departments  
The National Engineering School of Monastir has four independent departments:

 Mechanical engineering
 Electrical engineering
 Textile engineering
 Energy engineering

See also
 National Engineering School of Tunis
 National Engineering School of Bizerte
 National Engineering School of Sousse
 National Engineering School of Gafsa
 National Engineering School of Gabès
 National Engineering School of Sfax
 National Engineering School of Carthage
 Monastir Preparatory Engineering Institute
 Faculty of sciences of Monastir
 University of Monastir
 ENSAIT

References

External links 
 

Universities in Tunisia
1987 establishments in Tunisia